The Science of Good and Evil: Why People Cheat, Gossip, Care, Share, and Follow the Golden Rule is a 2004 book by Michael Shermer on ethics and evolutionary psychology. The book was published by Henry Holt and Company.

Reviews
In discussing Shermer's approach to ethics, a review by Ian Mason in the National Post said that he "makes a persuasive case for the Golden Rule as the foundation of morality" but "severely weakens his case by applying the 'scientific' label to all sorts of assertions and concepts that don't warrant it." Mason also said that "This stretching of the proper scope of scientific reasoning is symptomatic of Shermer's approach to systems he wishes to debunk."

In the College Quarterly, Howard Doughty wrote:
Shermer does not offer a very satisfactory definition of either good or evil. ... He does, however, occasionally speak eloquently about the ways in which human beings are challenged by moral notions and have generated forceful moral codes ... He fails, however, to locate morality in any kind of conceptual framework that would allow us to treat moral ideas as anything more than human judgments. There is nothing wrong with this, but such a view is inconsistent with the implication of the book's title, which at least suggests that good and evil are actual axiological categories that exist independent of human opinion.
Doughty concludes that the book is a "very good effort in the popularization of scientific exploration into an inherently contentious subject".

Release details
  350 pages.

References

External links
The Science of Good and Evil excerpt of the book on author's website

2004 non-fiction books
Ethics books
Moral psychology books
Books about evolutionary psychology
Books by Michael Shermer
English-language books
Scientific skepticism mass media